Francesco Boccapaduli (3 April 1600 – 23 November 1680) was a Roman Catholic prelate who served as Titular Archbishop of Athenae (1675–1680),
Apostolic Nuncio to Venice (1652–1654), Apostolic Nuncio to Switzerland (1647–1652), Bishop of Città di Castello (1647–1672), and Bishop of Valva e Sulmona (1638–1647).

Biography
Francesco Boccapaduli was born in Rome, Italy on 3 April 1600 and ordained a priest in 1623.
On 13 September 1638, he was appointed Bishop of Valva e Sulmona by Pope Urban VIII.

On 21 September 1638, he was consecrated bishop by Alessandro Cesarini (iuniore), Cardinal-Deacon of Sant'Eustachio, with Tommaso Carafa, Bishop Emeritus of Vulturara e Montecorvino, and Giovanni Battista Altieri, Bishop Emeritus of Camerino, serving as co-consecrators. 

On 6 May 1647, he was appointed Bishop of Città di Castello by Pope Innocent X.

On 14 September 1647, he was appointed Apostolic Nuncio to Switzerland by Pope Innocent X; he resigned from the post in September 1652.

On 24 August 1652, he was appointed Apostolic Nuncio to Venice by Pope Innocent X; he resigned from the post in 1654.

He served as Bishop of Città di Castello until his resignation on 1 October 1672. 
On 15 July 1675, he was appointed by Pope Clement X as Titular Archbishop of Athens (Greece), a title he held until his death on 23 November 1680.

Episcopal succession
While bishop, he was the principal consecrator of:
Thomas Henrici, Auxiliary Bishop of Basel and Titular Bishop of Chrysopolis in Arabia (1648);
and the principal co-consecrator of:
Pietro Alberini, Titular Archbishop of Nicomedia (1674);
Muzio Soriano, Archbishop of Santa Severina (1674); and
Vincenzo Ragni, Bishop of Oppido Mamertina (1674).

References

External links and additional sources
 (for Chronology of Bishops) 
 (for Chronology of Bishops) 
 (for Chronology of Bishops) 
 (for Chronology of Bishops) 
 (for Chronology of Bishops) 
 (for Chronology of Bishops) 
 (for Chronology of Bishops) 
 (for Chronology of Bishops) 

17th-century Roman Catholic titular bishops
Bishops appointed by Pope Urban VIII
Bishops appointed by Pope Innocent X
Bishops appointed by Pope Clement X
1600 births
1680 deaths
Apostolic Nuncios to the Republic of Venice
Clergy from Rome